Hu Rentian (born January 21, 1991, in Chengdu) is a Chinese professional footballer who currently plays for Chinese Super League club Wuhan Yangtze River.

Club career
Hu Rentian was promoted to the senior team of Tianjin Teda F.C. during the 2009 league season and would eventually make his debut on August 30, 2009, in a league game against Jiangsu Sainty where he would also score his first senior goal in a 1–0 victory. His abilities would quickly draw comparisons to fellow Tianjin and former Young Player of the Year award winner Hao Junmin and he was seen as his successor within the club. When Hao Junmin left the club to join FC Schalke 04 at the beginning of the 2010 league season Hu would have to prove himself within the team and the manager Arie Haan only used Hu sparingly throughout the season, however Tianjin would finish the league second and were eligible for the 2011 AFC Champions League. By the following season the manager showed more faith within Hu and while he only gave Hu a single continental appearance he did allow him to play in the 2011 Chinese FA Cup final, which Tianjin won 2-1 against Shandong Luneng.

He transferred to fellow Chinese Super League side Hebei China Fortune on February 23, 2018.

International career
Hu Rentian was included in the squad to qualify for the 2010 AFC U-19 Championship and would play in three games during qualification that saw the team easily qualify for the tournament. At the tournament Hu would go on to play in three further games as China were knocked out in the quarter-finals. He made his debut for China national football team on 3 June 2016 in a 4–2 win against Trinidad and Tobago, coming on as a substitute for Gao Lin in the second half. He scored his first international goal in the match.

Career statistics

Club statistics
.

International goal
As of match played 3 June 2016. China score listed first, score column indicates score after each Hu Rentian goal.

Honours

Club
Tianjin Teda
Chinese FA Cup: 2011

References

External links
Player stats at sohu.com
 

1991 births
Living people
Sportspeople from Chengdu
Chinese footballers
Footballers from Sichuan
Tianjin Jinmen Tiger F.C. players
Hebei F.C. players
Chinese Super League players
Association football midfielders
China international footballers